Longhua may refer to:

Places in the People's Republic of China

 Longhua County (隆化县), in Hebei
 Longhua District, Shenzhen (龙华区), in Shenzhen, Guangdong
 Longhua District, Haikou (龙华区), in Haikou, Hainan
 Longhua Temple (龙华寺), a temple in Shanghai
 Longhua Subdistrict (disambiguation) (龙华街道)

Towns in the People's Republic of China
Lónghuà (隆化镇):
 Longhua, Longhua County, seat of Longhua County, Hebei
 Longhua, Yicheng County, Shanxi
Lónghuá (龙华镇):
 Longhua, Chongqing, in Jiangjin District, Chongqing
 Longhua, Xianyou County, Fujian
 Longhua, Boluo County, Guangdong
 Longhua, Longmen County, Guangdong
 Longhua Town, Shenzhen, in Bao'an District, Shenzhen, Guangdong
 Longhua, Jing County, Hebei
 Longhua Town, Shanghai, in Xuhui District, Shanghai

Other
Longhua (collar), a Qing dynasty garment.